Coleotechnites ducharmei is a moth of the family Gelechiidae. It is found in North America, where it has been recorded from south-western Nova Scotia, southern Quebec, Ontario and Alberta.

Adults are brownish-grey. There is one generation per year with adults on wing in June.

The larvae feed on Picea species, including Picea rubens, Picea mariana and Picea glauca. Young larvae are yellowish with a dark brown head. Full-grown larvae have a distinctive body pattern consisting of transverse pink bands on a cream-yellow ground colour. Pupation takes place on the ground. The species overwinters in the pupal stage.

References

Moths described in 1962
Coleotechnites